Burcu Özberk (born 11 December 1989) is a Turkish actress. She has received a Golden Butterfly Award for Best Actress in a Romantic Comedy in 2020 for her role in Afili Aşk.

Career
Her sister is a violinist. Also, Burcu Özberk left to study violin at the State Conservatory's Music Department for elementary school. She graduated from the theater department of Hacettepe University State Conservatory.

Her television debut in 2013, in the historical series Muhteşem Yüzyıl and played the character of Huricihan Sultan. Her breakthrough came with her role as Nazlı Yılmaz in youth series Güneşin Kızları. She made her cinematic debut with the historical movie Direniş Karatay who won Türkiye Gençlik Best Actress Award. She also had parts in several plays at Erdal Beşikçioğlu's Tatbikat Stage, including Quills and Woyzeck.

She had leading role in romantic comedy series "Şahane Damat". Between 2017 and 2018, she played simultaneous comedy series "Aslan Ailem" and tv films "Badem Şekeri". Five movies were shot, due to "Badem Şekeri" was liked. She later had a leading role in Kanal D's romantic comedy series Afili Aşk, for which she won a Golden Butterfly Award as the Best Romantic Comedy Actress. She played in drama series "Çocukluk" with Erdal Beşikçioğlu. She was co-starring with İlhan Şen in Fox Turkey's romantic comedy Aşk Mantık İntikam.

Burcu is one of Hande Erçel's best friends since they acted together in Güneşin Kızları.

Between the years 2021–2022, she took the lead role with the character of Esra in the TV series Aşk Mantık İntikam, which was broadcast on the same channel.

Theater
Aşk Aptalı
Woyzeck Masalı
Marquis de Sade
Küçük Burjuvalar
Ayyar Hamza
Kuş Bakışı Kabare
Macbeth Abla
Kırmızı Başlıklı Kız ve Yol Arkadaşları

Filmography
Television

Film

References

External links 
 

Living people
21st-century Turkish actresses
Turkish female models
Turkish television actresses
Hacettepe University alumni
People from Eskişehir
1989 births